is a town located in Yoshino District, Nara Prefecture, Japan.

As of October 1, 2016, the town has an estimated population of 17,731 and a density of 470 persons per km². The total area is 38.06 km².

Surrounding municipalities
 Nara Prefecture
 Gose
 Gojō
 Yoshino
 Shimoichi
 Takatori

History
 1889 - Ōyodo village is created.
 1921 - Ōyodo village is renamed Ōyodo town.
 1952 - Ōada village is merged into Ōyodo town.

Education
 Primary Schools
 Ōyodo Sakuragaoka Elementary School
 Ōyodo Midorigaoka Elementary School
 Ōyodo Kibougaoka Elementary School
 Junior High Schools
 Ōyodo Junior High School
 High Schools
 Ōyodo High School

Transportation

Railway 

 Kintetsu Railway
 Yoshino Line: Kusurimizu - Fukugami - Ōada - Shimoichiguchi - Koshibe - Muda

Highways 

 Japan national routes
 Route 169
 Route 309
 Route 370

References

External links

 Ōyodo official website 

Towns in Nara Prefecture